Saran-e Bala (also Romanized as Sārān-e Bālā; also known as Deh-e Bālā’ī, Sārān, Sārān-e ‘Olyā, and Sarān ‘Olyā) is a village in Shesh Pir Rural District, Hamaijan District, Sepidan County, Fars Province, Iran. At the 2006 census, its population was 353, in 74 families.

References 

Populated places in Sepidan County